Cristoforo Alasia de Quesada (1864–1918) was an Italian mathematician.

Life and work 
Alasia studied at the universities of Turin (under Enrico D'Ovidio and Giuseppe Peano) and Rome (under Luigi Cremona). In 1893 began his academic career as mathematics professor in different high schools at Sassari, Tempio Pausania, Oristano, Ozieri, Brindisi and, finally, at Albenga.

Alasia was well known at the beginning of 20th century for he was the founder of Le Matematiche Pure e Applicate, a journal devoted to the improvement of scientific knowledge of mathematics teachers.

References

Bibliography

External links 
 
 

19th-century Italian mathematicians
1864 births
1918 deaths